The viper-like keelback (Hebius viperinus) is a species of snake of the family Colubridae.

Geographic range
The snake is found in Indonesia.

References 

Reptiles described in 1901
Taxa named by Ehrenfried Schenkel
Reptiles of Indonesia
Hebius
Taxobox binomials not recognized by IUCN